Shade: A Tale of Two Presidents is a book by photographer Pete Souza, published in 2018. The book juxtaposes pictures of American President Barack Obama with tweets from his successor Donald Trump.

References

2018 non-fiction books
Books about Barack Obama
Books about Donald Trump
Books of photographs
Little, Brown and Company books